New Galloway railway station served the town of New Galloway in Dumfries and Galloway, Scotland, from 1861 to 1965 on the Portpatrick and Wigtownshire Joint Railway.

History 
The station opened on 12 March 1861 by the Portpatrick and Wigtownshire Joint Railway. The signal box was situated east of the westbound platform and the goods yard was to the north. The platforms were extended in 1891. The station closed to both passengers and goods on 14 June 1965.

References

External links 

Disused railway stations in Dumfries and Galloway
Former Portpatrick and Wigtownshire Joint Railway stations
Railway stations in Great Britain opened in 1861
Railway stations in Great Britain closed in 1965
Beeching closures in Scotland
1861 establishments in Scotland